The paired (right and left) thalamogeniculate veins originate each from the posterior part of the thalamus. Their course roughly corresponds to the course of the corresponding thalamogeniculate artery on this side. They drain blood from the pulvinar, medial and lateral geniculate bodies. Benno Shlesinger in 1976 classified these veins as belonging to the central group of thalamic veins.

References 

Thalamic veins